Ophyx eurrhoa is a moth of the family Erebidae. It is found in Australia, where it has been recorded from Queensland.

The forewings are brown with a fuzzy dark crossline and a dark spot near the wingtip.

References

Ophyx
Moths described in 1903
Moths of Australia